Fred Viancos (born July 16, 1962) is an American former professional tennis player.

Viancos, born in Chile, was a collegiate tennis player for Texas Christian University. He turned professional after college in 1985 and was an early doubles partner of Jim Courier. In 1989 he featured in the men's doubles main draw of the Australian Open. He now serves as the chief operating officer of the United States Professional Tennis Association.

References

External links
 
 

1962 births
Living people
American male tennis players
TCU Horned Frogs men's tennis players
Chilean emigrants to the United States
Tennis players from Santiago